Sir Baden Pattinson KBE (22 December 1899 – 17 December 1978) was an Australian politician who represented the South Australian House of Assembly seats of Yorke Peninsula from 1930 to 1938 and Glenelg from 1947 to 1965 for the Liberal and Country League.

In 1962 Pattinson was appointed a Knight Commander of the Order of the British Empire (KBE).

References

 

1899 births
1978 deaths
Members of the South Australian House of Assembly
Liberal and Country League politicians
20th-century Australian politicians
Australian Knights Commander of the Order of the British Empire
Australian politicians awarded knighthoods